The Haarlem Basketball Week was a friendly basketball tournament held in Haarlem, Netherlands from 1982 till 2008. Several notable players have participated, including Sarunas Marciulionis, Drazen Petrovic, Vince Carter and Vlade Divac.

Editions

References

Basketball in the Netherlands